The Turkish men's national water polo team was formed in 1930s.

Results

Olympic Games

Olympic Games Qualification

FINA World League

European Championship

European Championship Qualification

European Championship Level II

LEN Europa Cup

European Games (Junior Team)

FINA World Development Trophy

Islamic Solidarity Games

Mediterranean Games

Current squad
Roster for the 2020 Men's European Water Polo Championship.

Head coach: Sinan Turunç

See also
Turkey women's national water polo team
LEN European U19 Water Polo Championship
LEN European Junior Water Polo Championship

References

Water polo
Men's national water polo teams
National water polo teams in Europe
National water polo teams by country
 
Men's sport in Turkey